All Rounder is a 1998 Telugu-language comedy film, produced by Nimmagadda Venkateswara Rao, Palli Kesava Rao and Mandava Suresh under the Surya Teja Movie Makers banner and directed by T. Prabhakar. It stars Rajendra Prasad, Sanghavi  and music composed by Veena Paani. The film was recorded as a flop at the box office.

Plot 
The film begins on Balaraju (Rajendra Prasad) a snake charmer at a village. Once Ramya (Sanghavi), daughter of a multi-millionaire Bapineedu (Raghunatha Reddy), a vainglory woman visits the place. Awkwardly her acquaintance with Balaraju begins with a petty quarrel when Ramya wants to take revenge. So, she keeps a challenge with Balaraju that he should play his snake continuously for 6 hours. Contingent upon, if Balaraju wins, Ramya will marry him or else he should turn as her servant. Ultimately, Balaraju holds the victory when Ramya falsifies him by misguiding to speak with her father. Trusting her, Balaraju reaches the city where he is humiliated and necked out. Right now, Balaraju decides to teach her a lesson, so, he civilizes himself and grows into an All-Rounder. Thereafter, he impresses Ramya and makes her fall in his love without revealing his identity. But when Ramya learns the truth she ploys and asks Balaraju to kidnap any millionaire on the occasion of her birthday to burgeon so that her father accepts their alliance. Here, Balaraju cleverly kidnaps Bapineedu, to tease Ramya. But unfortunately, Bapineedu is re-kidnaped by his P.A.J.P. (Jaya Prakash Reddy) to grab the property and indicts Balaraju. At present, Police are in search of Balaraju but every time his snake safeguards him. At that juncture, Police seeks the help of another modern snake charmer Anaconda (Brahmanandam). Parallelly, J.P. is in the hunt for the cellphone of Bapineedu which contains his entire property details. Fortuitously, it remained with Balaraju. The rest of the story is a comic tale that how Balaraju proves his innocence and protects Bapineedu.

Cast 
Rajendra Prasad as Balaraju
Sanghavi as Ramya
Brahmanandam as Anaconda
Babu Mohan as Head constable Engine Oil Anjineelu
Rami Reddy as S.I. Appa Rao
Jaya Prakash Reddy as J.P.
Raghunatha Reddy as Bapineedu
Rajendra Babu as Chandram
Ashok Kumar as Sweet Shop Owner
Bandla Ganesh as Pilla Pilasa
Raksha as Item number
Ratna Sagar as Balaraju's bamma
Madhurisen as Anjineelu's sister

Soundtrack 

Music composed by Veena Paani. Music released on Supreme Music Company.

References 

1990s Telugu-language films